Dunstall is a civil parish in the district of East Staffordshire, Staffordshire, England.  It contains 13 buildings that are recorded in the National Heritage List for England.  Of these, two are listed at Grade II*, the middle grade, and the others are at Grade II, the lowest grade.  The parish contains the village of Dunstall and the surrounding countryside.  The Trent and Mersey Canal passes through the eastern part of the parish and associated with this are a roving bridge and a milepost, and there is also a listed milepost nearby on the A38 road.  The other listed buildings include a country house and associated structures, a smaller house, farmhouses and farm buildings, a church, and a former school.


Key

Buildings

References

Citations

Sources

Lists of listed buildings in Staffordshire